Tim Bonner (born December 7, 1995) is an American professional gridiron football defensive end for the Houston Gamblers of the United States Football League (USFL).

Early life and high school
Bonner grew up in Demopolis, Alabama and attended Demopolis High School. He was named first team All-State as a senior after recording 84 tackles with 31 tackles for loss and nine sacks in ten games played. Bonner committed to play college football at Louisville over offers from Mississippi State and Kentucky.

College career
Bonner began his collegiate career at Louisville, where he redshirted his true freshman season. He was dismissed from the team going into his redshirt freshman season after a female student accused him of having a gun. Following his dismissal, Bonner transferred to East Mississippi Community College, where he was featured in the  second season of the Netflix documentary series Last Chance U.  In his lone season at East Mississippi, Bonner recorded 37 tackles, 5.5 sacks and two fumble recoveries and committed to transfer to Florida Atlantic University (FAU).

Bonner played for the FAU Owls for three seasons. He played in 38 games with 58 tackles, 15.5 tackles for loss, eight sacks, and two forced fumbles at FAU.

Professional career

BC Lions
On December 9, 2020, Bonner was signed by the BC Lions of the Canadian Football League (CFL). Bonner was released by the Lions on September 20, 2022.

Edmonton Elks
On September 22, 2022, Bonner signed with the Edmonton Elks of the Canadian Football League (CFL). On February 14, 2023, Bonner was released by the Elks.

Houston Gamblers
On February 15, 2023, Bonner signed with the Houston Gamblers of the United States Football League (USFL).

References

External links
BC Lions bio
Florida Atlantic Owls bio

1995 births
Living people
American football defensive ends
BC Lions players
Canadian football defensive linemen
East Mississippi Lions football players
Louisville Cardinals football players
Players of American football from Alabama
People from Demopolis, Alabama
Florida Atlantic Owls football players
Houston Gamblers (2022) players